Harzand may refer to:
 Harzand-e Atiq
 Harzand-e Jadid
 Harzand Station
 Harzand (horse)